Ariel López may refer to:

 Ariel López (footballer, born 1974), Argentine forward
 Ariel López (footballer, born 2000), Argentine forward